University School of Chemical Technology (USCT) is one of the constituent school of Guru Gobind Singh Indraprastha University.

History
The university was established by government of NCT of Delhi under the provisions of Guru Gobind Singh Indraprastha University Act, 1998. It is located at Dwarka, New Delhi. The old campus of the university was situated in Kashmere Gate, New Delhi. USCT was established in 1998, the same year when other constituent schools were formed. 
It was a step by the university to start the University School of Chemical Technology, the only one of its kind in this part of the country after IIT Delhi.

Programs
School offers the following programme, in the field of Chemical Engineering:-
B.Tech+M.Tech Dual Degree - 6-year program
Ph.D   - Minimum 2 year
From 2013 onwards the school has also started offering :
B.Tech+M.Tech Dual Degree (Biochemical Engineering) - 6-year program

The dual degree programs are offered under a 4+2 scheme, wherein a student can exit at the end of four years with a B.Tech. degree.

Syllabus/Course
The B.Tech/M.Tech. (Integrated) programme is meant to impart knowledge of various core chemical engineering subjects, inter- disciplinary courses in biotechnology, Management Studies through electives, and Industrial exposure through practical training in Laboratories and Industrial Units.

Admission
Admission for the four year B.Tech. course is done on the basis of merit; strictly based on JEE(Mains) for the B.Tech. Program and for M.Tech. program either the GATE score or entrance exam based merit is required.

Facilities
Hostel facility is available for both girls and boys, single room being allotted to an individual. University canteen is open during the college hours. The university has the major sports facilities including Football, Volleyball, Basketball, Lawn Tennis, Table Tennis, Badminton, Tug of war, Cricket, Athletics. Health care centre remains open during college hours and doctors and specialists are available.

Student Activities
The students of USCT actively participate in various competitions held by the university, IITs and other chemical organisations. The REACT Society of USCT is an active organization that has been formed to advance the objectives of the student community of the University School of Chemical Technology to stimulate interaction and interest between faculty and students of all academic areas in the USCT. It aims at providing academic outreach as well as ties to the local industries and chemical engineering professionals. Also to provide students with opportunities that are not available within the classroom and are related to the field of chemical and biochemical engineering.
The student chapter of IIChE (Indian Institute of Chemical Engineers) has been opened since 2016.
Students of USCT have participated in many notable national as well as international competitions such as Schemcon and those organised by AIChE(American Institute of Chemical Engineers).

See also
Guru Gobind Singh Indraprastha University
Education in Delhi

References

Chemical research institutes
Constituent schools of Guru Gobind Singh Indraprastha University
Educational institutions established in 1999
Engineering colleges in Delhi
Chemical industry of India
1999 establishments in Delhi